James Turman Barron (born December 25, 1955) is an American journalist who writes for The New York Times. He authored the 2006 book, Piano: The Making of a Steinway Concert Grand.

Biography
He was born on December 25, 1955, to Leirona Turman and James Pressley Barron (1920–2006). His father served in the U.S. Army in World War II and was an analyst for the Central Intelligence Agency. He received the Intelligence Commendation Medal upon his retirement in 1985.

His mother was an assistant principal of Thomas Jefferson Junior High School in Arlington, Virginia.

He graduated from Princeton University in 1977 and was a stringer for The New York Times while in college.

He married Jane-Iris Farhi, a cardiologist.

Bibliography

References

1955 births
Living people
Princeton University alumni
The New York Times writers
Place of birth missing (living people)
Recipients of the Intelligence Commendation Medal
American newspaper journalists
American male journalists
20th-century American journalists